7 Vidas is a Spanish sitcom which aired on Telecinco from 1999 to 2006. Its title translates as "7 lives" and the symbol of the sitcom is a cat, in reference to the belief that cats have 7 lives (in contrast to English-speaking countries, where they are believed to have nine lives).

Originally inspired by the American blockbuster Friends, it was not a big ratings hit initially, but over time, the show gained in popularity, ultimately becoming the most popular Spanish TV series of all time. By the end of its run, the show was totally different from its original source.

It was in 7 Vidas that the now internationally famous actress Paz Vega and Javier Cámara first became household names in Spain.

The sitcom tells the story of a group of friends in Madrid. David (Toni Cantó) awakes from a coma after more than 18 years, and starts discovering the new world in which he lives. His neighbour, Sole (Amparo Baró) is an old woman with a penchant for slapping anyone who behaves in a way she dislikes round the back of the neck. Her sexually frustrated son, Paco (Javier Cámara) is David's best friend, Carlota (Blanca Portillo) David's single sister and Laura (Laurita to her friends) (Paz Vega), their cousin from Seville (with her colourful Sevillian accent), initially Paco's principal love interest and then David's.

Characters came and went, and by the end of the sitcom the only character who had appeared in the first series and lasted until its end was Sole. Other long-standing characters, and the two most popular, in addition to Sole, were Gonzalo (Gonzalo de Castro), a waiter who later became a main character and Carlota's husband (although they were later divorced), and Diana (Anabel Alonso), a frustrated actress, and a naïve lesbian. She was the first homosexual character in Spanish television who did not follow stereotypes.

The script of the show was well known for poking fun at current events, politicians and celebrities and often contained a lot of risqué jokes.

Scenes were generally set in Sole's house, Carlota's house, or in Gonzalo's café "Casi Ke No" - the equivalent of Friends' Central Perk café. Like its inspiration, the cafe's name was a pun: the logo makes the expression, meaning "maybe not", appear to read "casino".

7 Vidas was also known for its multiple cameos of famous people, including Shakira, El Canto del Loco, politician Santiago Carrillo and footballer Samuel Eto'o. Hugh Grant was pencilled in to appear in one chapter, but the actor subsequently declined the offer.

By the show's final season, it had moved considerably away from its Friends inspiration, and celebrated its final, 204th, episode with a plot featuring all of the 19 main characters who had appeared over the series' history, including a video from Paz Vega, who was busy filming in the United States and unable to appear in person. A live performance of the main theme was also performed by El Canto del Loco, a Spanish pop group. The episode was recorded and transmitted live without interruptions, bar a few minutes for commercials, which were used to change clothes and represent the passing of the time.

ANT1 channel in Greece picked up the rights to 7 Vidas for a Greek remake of the show, premiering in its fall 2008 lineup and entitled 7 Zωές (7 Lives).

Main

Spin-off Aída 
The popularity of 7 vidas led in 2005 to a spin-off, Aída, which came to an end in 2014 after 237 episodes, surpassing the record of its parent series.  It centred around Aída, a recurring supporting 7 vidas character, known for her vulgarity and for representing a "typical" working class Spanish woman. The series was set in a new context, with entirely new characters, though some characters from 7 vidas appeared in some episodes, and others, mentioned in 7 vidas but never shown, were introduced as regulars of the new show. In 2009, when Carmen Machi, the actress who played Aída, left the series, new characters appeared and the series continued under the same basic premise with, among others, Paco León.

External links
Official Website in Spanish

7 vidas Spanish

Spanish television sitcoms
Television shows set in Madrid
Telecinco network series
1990s Spanish comedy television series
2000s Spanish comedy television series
1999 Spanish television series debuts
2006 Spanish television series endings